The Little Theatre on the Square is a theater in Sullivan, Illinois. It is located in the heart of Sullivan’s town square on Harrison Street. It is the only professional theater between Chicago and St. Louis.

History 
The theater originally opened in 1924 as a movie theater, called "The Grand Theatre."  The Grand Theatre showed movies throughout the year, except during the summer months. It was in 1957 that Guy S. Little, Jr. came up with the idea of renting out the theater for the summer months to present plays. Renting the theater allowed him to begin fulfilling his lifelong dream of owning and operating a quality professional theater.

Entering into the first "Summer of Musicals," Little was fresh out of graduate school in New York where he had been studying and doing work in the professional theater. When Little began the theater, he called it "Summer of Musicals" until he actually purchased The Grand Theatre in 1963 and officially changed the name to "The Little Theatre on the Square." Mr. Little continued to bring many plays and musicals to the small town throughout his ownership of the theater.

After twenty-two years of operating the theater, Mr. Little announced that he would not be putting on a twenty-third season due to the cost of operation and salaries for the stars and supporting actors. Although the twenty-third season was not run by Little, it did occur thanks to Sullivan Theatre, Inc. which put on five shows for the season. With the resignation of Little, the theater went from an independently owned business to a non-profit enterprise. The theater began operating as a not for profit organization in 1981 and continued to produce many plays and musicals. It was run by a board of trustees who represented the regional market area of Central Illinois. On a later, unknown date, The Little Theater on the Square Inc. purchased the building from Mr. Little and began renovations to surrounding buildings. The year after purchasing the theater, the board decided to purchase adjoining buildings that, once renovated, would house the ticket office, public restroom, and administrative offices. In the year 2000, the theater purchased another building that was used for rehearsal space, a dance studio, and apartments that would house the actors during their stay. Yet another building was purchased in 2001, this one was used for the technical production facility.

Digital archives
A digital archive of Little Theatre production photos and programs is available in Eastern Illinois University's online repository, The Keep.  This digital repository is a service of EIU's Booth Library.

Programs  for many of The Little Theatre's past shows are also available online through a digital project of Eastern Illinois University's Booth Library in conjunction with the Consortium of Academic and Research Libraries in Illinois Digital Collections.

Outreach program 
The theater began an educational outreach program in 1997, in response to a request from the City of Sullivan Civic Center. The program was originally used to teach jazz, tap, and ballet classes. In 2000, drama and vocal performance classes were added. In 2012, voice lessons were added. Formally known as Students’ Theatre Arts Reach (S.T.A.R.), the current Future Stars Program provides educational opportunities in the Arts for people ages three through adult.

The outreach program was expanded in January, 2004 by adding a touring program to S.T.A.R.  The program allowed the students participating in the program to tour to area schools and offer their performances. More than 26,000 students in the area benefited from the tour program before it was discontinued. Currently, the Little Theatre offers two shows during the school year (one in the fall and one in the spring) where area schools can attend a live performance on their stage.

In 2017, the education program became Future Stars Dance & Drama and features visiting artists who are working professionals teaching acting, dance and voice. Students form a 50+ mile radius are enrolled in the program. The website is http://danceanddrama.org/home

Adopt a Seat 
In 2004, after the theater had finished renovations it began a program called "Adopt a Seat."  It is a program for theater patrons that allows them to have their name, or the name of someone they want to honor, placed on the seating chart plaque that is located in the lobby. Patrons who wish to participate in this program are asked to donate $1000 to the operating budget and can do so over a three-year period. As of now, over one hundred patrons have agreed to participate in the Adopt-A-Seat program and the money has helped The Little Theatre with the cost of renovations and putting on shows.

Cast 
Many different actors, both famous and relatively unknown, have shown up on stage throughout the many seasons of the theater in Sullivan. In 1959, the theater became a part of the Actors' Equity Association and began featuring easily recognizable stars who were Equity members, along with others who were not Equity members. Guy Little, Jr. would choose his cast members, both Equity and non-Equity, from auditions in New York and Chicago during the off seasons. He averaged approximately thirty-five performers per show.  A few of the bigger-name stars that have been seen on stage are Alan Alda, Ruth Warrick, Rosemary Prinz, Margaret Hamilton, Eddie Bracken, Joe E. Brown, Margaret Truman, Ann B. Davis, Annamary Dickey, Don Hastings, John Carradine, Dennis Weaver, Robert Reed, Cesar Romero, Betty Ann Grove, Patricia Morrison, Ron Ely, Betty Grable, Virginia Graham, Bill Hayes, Ann Miller, Jean-Pierre Aumont, Mickey Rooney, Kathryn Crosby, Kitty Carlisle, Robert Newman, and many more.

The Little Theatre offered few famous performers after Guy Little left in 1978.  In recent years, Cindy Williams, and Eddie Mekka performed.

Actors and appearances
Rosemary Prinz was a regular summer actress at the Little Theatre during the peak of her career. She performed in 1961, 1963-1967, 1969, 1972-1975, 1977, and 1982. She made her debut on Broadway in 1952 and had a role on the television show As the World Turns from 1956 to 1968.

John Carradine appeared twice on stage at the Little Theatre in 1965 (Oliver!) and 1966 (Dracula). He had already appeared in feature films such as The Grapes of Wrath in 1940 and The Ten Commandments in 1956.  Throughout his career he appeared in 225 motion pictures.

Ann Miller appeared on stage in 1973 after her career had peaked. She had already appeared in 40 feature films from 1934 to 1973.

Mickey Rooney appeared at the theater in 1976 as the lead in Three Goats and a Blanket. He had already appeared in 122 films and 2 television shows.

Kitty Carlisle appeared on stage at the theater in 1978 in The Marriage-Go-Round. She had already appeared in four films and was a regular panelist on To Tell the Truth from 1957 to 1978.

In recent years, a number of performers and artist who have appeared at The Little Theatre been featured on Broadway and in the West End (London) including Marisha Wallace (Aladdin, Something Rotten, Dreamgirls), J. Michael Zygo (Once, School Of Rock) and Alysha Deslorieux, (Hamilton, Once On This Island). Countless actors have also performed in National Touring Companies of various shows.

In 2018, Colleen Zenk, starred as Dolly Gallagher Levi in Hello, Dolly! Zenk is best known for her role as Barbara Ryan in the daytime TV drama As the World Turns, a role she played from September 1978 until the show left the air in September 2010.

First season vs. now
The first Summer of Musicals, in 1957, featured nine shows in nine weeks with each show giving four performances, Thursday through Sunday. The tickets ranged in price from $.90 to $2.20. The final musical for the season, Guys and Dolls, sold out and was the first one to force the balcony seats to open.

The 2009 season for The Little Theatre consisted of two off season performances, in March and April, and five regular season shows. The ticket prices ranged from $26 to $28 per show and season tickets could be purchased for $100. Each summer show runs for two weeks, Tuesday through Sunday.

As of 2017, the summer season includes 5 musical, 1 play and 3 TYA (theatre for Young Audience shows. Ticket prices have increased slightly. Individual ticket prices (including fees) are $37.50, $34.50 (Seniors, 62+) and $21.75 (Students under 22).

References

Theatres in Illinois
Buildings and structures in Moultrie County, Illinois
Tourist attractions in Moultrie County, Illinois